William Finke (1814 or 1815 – 17 January 1864) was a prospector and pastoralist in South Australia, remembered as a sponsor of John McDouall Stuart's exploratory journeys, along with  the Chambers brothers.

History
Finke, who may have been born Johann Wilhelm Finke from Cuxhaven in Germany, arrived in South Australia aboard the Tam O'Shanter in November 1836 as part of the First Fleet of South Australia.

He was a member of a syndicate with Osmond Gilles, the first colonial treasurer, his nephew John Jackson Oakden and three others who entered the ballot in February 1839 for the right to purchase land in Glenelg, in which they were successful. Finke is shown as "chief clerk of the Treasury" in the public notice of the ballot. Finke had been appointed chief clerk to Gilles, and in 1839 was put in charge of mining galena for his Glen Osmond Union Mining Company, the first mine for metal-bearing ores in South Australia and perhaps Australia. He was also appointed Honourable Secretary of Glenelg Pier and Warehouse Company, which had offices in Gilles Arcade.

Finke was an energetic explorer and prospector throughout South Australia, but particularly in the northern Flinders Ranges, where he established productive copper mines at Nuccaleena and Oratunga, but missed the huge deposits at Burra and Kapunda. He frequently employed Scottish explorer John McDouall Stuart as travelling companion on these trips.

Finke and James Chambers developed the Moolooloo station, from where Stuart's final and successful expedition departed. James died before the party's triumphant return and Finke not long after. John Chambers, as executor of his brother's Will, sold the run to Philip Levi & Co., who sold it to John Rounsevell in 1871.

Finke died at the John Bull Inn in Currie Street, Adelaide. His remains were buried at the North Road Cemetery, in the Adelaide suburb of Nailsworth.

Anna Timmermann, Andreas Finke and Wilhelmina Arndt of Germany were named as having an interest in two properties in Glenelg two years after Finke's death.

Recognition
The Finke River in central Australia and Mount Finke in South Australia were named after him by Stuart in 1858 and 1860 respectively.  Finke Bay on the coast of the Van Diemen Gulf in the Northern Territory is considered to be named by Stuart after Finke in 1862. The tiny settlement of Finke which grew around a railway siding on the Central Australia Railway and is now also known by its traditional name Aputula, derived its name from the nearby Finke River.

References 

1814 births
1864 deaths
Australian pastoralists
Australian explorers
Australian prospectors
19th-century Australian businesspeople